Bernardo Arturo de la Maza Bañados (born 3 January 1946) is a Chilean journalist who was elected as a member of the Chilean Constitutional Convention.

On 28 October 2021, he resigned to Chile Vamos, centre-right coalition he represented in the Convention.

He worked in Televisión Nacional de Chile from 1970s to 2000s. About his early years there ―occurred during Augusto Pinochet's dictatorship― he stated at Mentiras Verdaderas that he was a «victim» of the TV montages of the military regime, in which he participed as communicator of the Informe especial program.

Biography

TV career
In 2008, he joined Megavisión.

See also
 Informe Especial
 List of members of the Chilean Constitutional Convention

References

External links
 Official Website

Living people
1946 births
Chilean journalists
Chilean television presenters
Chilean television personalities
21st-century Chilean politicians
Pontifical Catholic University of Chile alumni
Members of the Chilean Constitutional Convention
People from Santiago
Chilean political commentators